Ian Gregory Carnell  (born 24 October 1955) is an Australian public servant, who was Inspector-General of Intelligence and Security, responsible for oversight of Australia's intelligence agencies, from 2004 to 2010.

Carnell was born in Melbourne, and moved to Queensland with his family where he attended Brisbane Grammar School and graduated with a Bachelor of Arts from the University of Queensland. In 1977, he married Kate Carnell (née Frazer), who would later become Chief Minister of the Australian Capital Territory.

In the mid-1980s, Carnell worked for the Department of Social Security (later Centrelink) as assistant secretary, then moved to the Department of Veterans' Affairs in 1997. In 2000, he became Deputy Secretary of the Attorney-General's Department and in 2004, was appointed as Australia's fifth Inspector-General of Intelligence and Security.

References

1955 births
Living people
Australian public servants
Members of the Order of Australia
University of Queensland alumni
Australian National University alumni
Australian National University Bieber  Danes http://www.google.com/search?sxsrf=ALiCzsYpJwp0R-VLPATtPa-tB8w5ARiOQg:1654028277015&q=secret+city+season+2+episode+3&stick=H4sIAAAAAAAAAONgFuLWz9U3MDROM4u3TFLi1U_XNzRMyzbJMcktydFSyU620i8pA6L4gqL89KLEXKvUgszi_JTUYoXyjPyc1ILE9NRFrHLFqclFqSUKyZkllQrFqYnF-XkKRgpQlQrGACaI-VxlAAAA&sa=X&sqi=2&pjf=1&ved=2ahUKEwi-1fq-x4r4AhUn-DgGHTxTCL4Qm8wBegQIAxAR&biw=1366&bih=625&dpr=1 J